Dance Hall is a 1929 American pre-Code musical film directed by Melville Brown and written by Jane Murfin and J. Walter Ruben, based on the short story of the same name by Vina Delmar. The film centers a love triangle with a shipping clerk competing with a dashing aviator for the affections of a young taxi dancer. It was Radio Pictures' second to last release of the decade, and was a critical and financial flop.

Plot
Shipping clerk Tommy Flynn (Arthur Lake) engages Gracie Nolan (Olive Borden), a young taxi dancer, and the two gain some success in dance halls, winning several dance contests. As they do, he becomes infatuated with her, but she only has eyes for Ted Smith (Ralph Emerson) a pilot who wants her as a trophy of his own.

Flynn is unsuccessful in his attempts to woo the young Gracie, until the pilot crashes during his attempt at a transcontinental flight. Flynn hides the fact from Gracie that the pilot is still alive, as he attempts to get her to fall in love with him. When she discovers his subterfuge, she is enraged and rushes off to be with the pilot.

However, when she finds Smith, she uncovers that he has been living with another woman. Devastated, she returns to Tommy, who takes her back.  Reunited, the two lovers become a successful dancing team.

Cast

 Arthur Lake as Tommy Flynn
 Olive Borden as Gracie Nolan
 Joseph Cawthorn as Bremmer
 Margaret Seddon as Mrs. Flynn
 Ralph Emerson as Ted Smith
 Lee Moran as Ernie
 Helen Kaiser as Bee
 Tom O'Brien as Truck driver
 George Irving as Doctor Loring

Production
In February 1929, it was announced that Viña Delmar had been signed by RKO to write the story of Dance Hall. By the end of June, RKO had scheduled filming to begin on approximately August 1, 1929.

In September, The Film Daily reported that Melville Brown had been signed to a long-term contract by RKO, and that Dance Hall would be his first project with his new studio, and in early October, it was learned that J. Walter Ruben would be contributing to the script's dialogue. Also in October, RKO announced that Arthur Lake and Olive Borden were attached to the project, and also that Margaret Seddon, Ralph Emerson and Tom O'Brien would be joining the cast. The production featured the introduction of two new dances: the "Dumb Drag" and the "Blue Bottom".

While originally scheduled for August, filming on Dance Hall did not begin until mid-October 1929. After production began, a fire at Consolidated Film Industries, the laboratory developing the negatives, destroyed two days worth of filming. By November 20, filming on Dance Hall had concluded and the picture was being edited.

Dance Hall opened on December 15, 1929, at the Globe Theater in New York City, although the American Film Institute has it opening a day earlier.

Reception
In his film review for The New York Times, Mordaunt Hall characterized Dance Hall as mildly entertaining,  "... while it may be a slice of life, or whatever one cares to characterize it, the result is far from being an edifying entertainment. Possibly some of those who compete in marathon dances may find that this production appeals to them, but others, young or old, will, in all probability, wish for something just a trifle more stimulating to the mind than this tale of a dance cup winner and his love for his partner."

Film historians Richard Jewell and Vernon Harbin in The RKO Story (1982) considered Dance Hall, a "sour note ..."  yet "... mildly diverting." They further described that the film "collapsed in the critical areas of acting (Arthur Lake was the weakest of the weak), (and) dialogue ..."

References

Notes

Citations

Bibliography

 Jewell, Richard B. and Vernon Harbin. The RKO Story. New York: Arlington House, 1982. .
 Pendo, Stephen. Aviation in the Cinema. Lanham, Maryland: Scarecrow Press, 1985. .
 Wynne, H. Hugh. The Motion Picture Stunt Pilots and Hollywood's Classic Aviation Movies. Missoula, Montana: Pictorial Histories Publishing Co., 1987. .

External links
 
 
 
 

1929 films
1929 musical films
American aviation films
American musical films
American black-and-white films
Films based on short fiction
RKO Pictures films
Films with screenplays by Jane Murfin
Films directed by Melville W. Brown
Films based on works by Viña Delmar
1920s American films